Orthogonius dispar is a species of ground beetle in the subfamily Orthogoniinae. It was described by Henry Walter Bates in 1892.

References

dispar
Beetles described in 1892